Nicole Antibe (born 11 April 1974 in Paris, France) is a French basketball player. Antibe has had 193 selections on  the French national women's basketball team from 1993-2005 .

References 
 sports reference federation francaise de basket-ball

French women's basketball players
Basketball players from Paris
Olympic basketball players of France
Basketball players at the 2000 Summer Olympics
Living people
1974 births